The 2000 World U-17 Hockey Challenge was hosted by Timmins, Ontario (and various communities) from December 27, 1999, to January 3, 2000.  The event was won by Russia who beat Ontario in the Final 2-0.

Teams
The participating teams included:
 Atlantic
 Quebec
 Ontario
 West
 Pacific

The winning Russian team roster:

 Nikita Vdovenko
 Andrei Medvedev
 Igor Kyazev
 Vladimir Korsunov
 Alexandre Frantsouzov
 Victor Outchevatov
 Maxim Kondratiev
 Artem Ternavski
 Renat Mamachev
 Leonid Zhvatchkin
 Stanislav Pupyrev
 Ilya Kovalchuk
 Timofei Shishkanov
 Yuri Trubachev
 Alexander Blokhin
 Konstantin Mikhailov
 Alexei Kigorodov
 Alexander Poloushin
 Stanislav Tchistov
 Evgueni Artioukhin
 Oleg Minakov
 Vladislav Evseev

Results

Final standings

References

Hockey Canada Site

U-17
U-17
U-17
U-17
U-17
U-17
Sport in Timmins
World U-17 Hockey Challenge
International ice hockey competitions hosted by Canada